John Gandy may refer to:

 John Peter Gandy (1787–1850), British architect
 John Manuel Gandy (1870–1947), college president